The 2005–06 Highland Football League was won by Deveronvale. Fort William finished bottom.

Table

Results

Highland Football League seasons
5
Scottish